Shelby County may refer to:

Counties 
 Shelby County, Alabama
 Shelby County, Illinois
 Shelby County, Indiana
 Shelby County, Iowa
 Shelby County, Kentucky
 Shelby County, Missouri
 Shelby County, Ohio
 Shelby County, Tennessee
 Shelby County, Texas

Other uses
 The U.S. Supreme Court case Shelby County v. Holder